State University of New York Maritime College (SUNY Maritime College) is a public maritime college in the Bronx, New York City. It is part of the State University of New York (SUNY) system.  Founded in 1874, the SUNY Maritime College was the first college of its kind (federally approved, offering commercial nautical instruction) to be founded in the United States and is one of only seven degree-granting maritime academies in the United States.

History 
Maritime College is the oldest institution of its kind in the United States. Due in part to the Civil War, there was a decline in the American maritime industry and a growing concern about the professionalism of its officers. As a result, the New York Chamber of Commerce and maritime interests of the port of New York lobbied the state legislature to create a professional nautical school for the city.  This was done in 1873, but the school lacked a ship. The chamber then teamed up with the noted naval education reformer and modernizer, Stephen B. Luce.  Luce led the effort, and through his efforts an act was passed by Congress in 1874 that enabled individual states to request from the Navy retired or obsolete vessels to train seamen.  The state of New York then appealed to the Navy for a training vessel.  On December 14, 1874, the USS St. Mary's arrived in New York harbor and became the home of the longest running nautical school in the United States.  Originally administered by the Board of Education of the City of New York, it was conducted as a grammar school that taught common school subjects (along with nautical classes) during the winter term, and then held practical cruises during the summer term.  As time advanced, the school began to teach more advanced professional subjects.  During this early period, the school was typically run on an annual appropriation of $20,000 to $30,000 with the school often facing closure because the cost per pupil was much higher than in a regular public school, mainly due to the overhead of ship maintenance and student board.

By 1907, the St. Mary's was replaced by the gunboat Newport, a sail-steam hybrid.

In 1913 New York City threatened to close the school due to its costs.  However, the state of New York took over its management and renamed it the New York State Nautical School.  Despite being a state institution, the school was almost closed in 1916, again for budgetary reasons, but efforts from the maritime industry and the school's alumni kept it alive.  After this time, the American merchant marine grew and subsequently a greater demand for trained American merchant marine brought growth to the school.

During this period, the school was administered by a Board of Governors in addition to the Superintendent.  In 1921, the school, which had for long moved from berth to berth, found itself at Bedloe's Island (now Liberty Island) in New York Harbor.  There they were allowed to use the army facilities.  Over time, conditions on the island were deemed inadequate to teach modern merchant mariners.

With the growing demand, a push was made by then superintendent James Harvey Tomb beginning in 1927 to acquire a larger ship and a land-based institution. The ship came in the form of the Procyon, which was renamed the Empire State.  This ship effectively doubled the size of the school. 
Finally, the school, renamed the "New York State Merchant Marine Academy" in 1929, became land-based in 1938 at the Maritime College's present Throggs Neck campus in Fort Schuyler. One of Franklin D. Roosevelt's last acts as Governor of New York State was to sign the act turning Fort Schuyler and the Throggs Neck peninsula over to the school for use as a shore-based facility of higher education. Work restoring Fort Schuyler for the academy's use was done at first by the Temporary Emergency Relief Administration (TERA) in 1934 followed by the Works Progress Administration in 1935.  The fort was restored, allowing the school to operate there by 1938.  In 1946 degree conferring status was granted, and the academy became a college.  The college was one of the original institutions incorporated into the State University of New York system in 1948.

Academics 
All of the college's bachelor's degree programs may be combined with preparation for the professional license as a United States Merchant Marine Officer. The College also offers a master's degree in International Transportation Management and Maritime and Naval Studies; as well as several graduate Professional Mariner Training certificates. Most of the degree programs may be completed while concurrently preparing for the United States Merchant Marine officer's license as a third mate or third assistant engineer. Additionally, SUNY Maritime College has the only United States Navy/United States Marine Corps Reserve Officers Training Corps (ROTC) program in the metropolitan New York City area, which prepares enrollees for commissioned officer positions in the United States Navy and United States Marine Corps. , the graduates of SUNY Maritime College earned US$144,000, the highest average annual salary of any university graduates in the United States.

Athletics

The Maritime Privateers compete in 16 NCAA Division III varsity sports (8 men's, 6 women's, 2 co-ed).

Regiment 
SUNY Maritime College has a regiment to fulfill the USCG requirements for obtaining a license through a college.  The regiment has a Pipe and Drum Band, Regimental Band, Honor Guard (Color Guard and Drill Team), and a Security Company. The Band and Honor Guard perform at events both on and off campus, such as parades and dinners.

Incoming Cadets must go through Indoctrination (shortened to INDOC), a ten days of training in August where they learn leadership and basic seamanship skills. During freshman year, aka Mariner Under Guidance (MUG) year, Cadets are made to square corners, stand at attention for all upperclassmen, have room inspections, and maintain the uniform of the day.

Notable alumni 
 Commodore Leroy J. Alexanderson, the last Master of the 
 John W. Anderson, longest serving Master of the 
 Peter Coleman, class of 1981, Won the Gold Medal. Mallory Cup, in 1983 for North American Men's Sailing Championship
 Jerome T. Dennehy, class of 1955, Naval Aviator VF-32  (first squadron to transition to F8U-1 Crusader), Cmdr. USGC Guam 
 John Ferriola, class of 1974, President and Chief Operating Officer of Nucor
 Joseph Hazelwood, Master of the Exxon Valdez
 Gary Jobson, class of 1973, America's Cup tactician in 1977 for Ted Turner; self-proclaimed pre-eminent ambassador for sailing in the U.S.
 Scott Kelly, NASA astronaut, author, Endurance: A Year in Space, A Lifetime of Discovery
John Konrad, founder of the maritime news and blog website gCaptain, ship captain, journalist/author, and distinguished alumni award recipient
James M. Maloney, Class of 1980, lawyer known for challenging NY's nunchaku ban
 Harry Manning, Class of 1914, master mariner, Captain of the SS United States on her maiden Blue Riband Atlantic crossings and navigator for Amelia Earhart.
 Kevin Mannix, Commander, United States Navy, Class of 1986, former Flight Leader and Commanding Officer, Blue Angels Flight Demonstration Team; assumed command of the Blue Angels in November 2006
 Ross Gilmore Marvin, class of 1902, accompanied Robert Peary on expeditions to the North Pole.
 Kevin McCarey, environmentalist, author and Emmy Award–winning documentary film maker.
Daniel J. McCarthy, class of 1986, Former President and Chief Executive Officer of Frontier Communications
 Dan Meuser, American businessman and U.S. Representative in Congress.
 Felix Riesenberg, class of 1897, master mariner, author
 Edward Villella, dancer and choreographer

Notable attendees 
 Geraldo Rivera (1961–1963), television journalist and former talk show host
 Louis E. Willett, Private First Class, U.S. Army; recipient of the Medal of Honor

Gallery

See also 
 Fort Schuyler Museum
 United States Merchant Marine Academy
 List of Presidents and Superintendents of the State University of New York Maritime College and Preceding Organizations
 List of Training Ships of the State University of New York Maritime College and Preceding Organizations

References

External links 
 Official website
 Official athletics website

 
Educational institutions established in 1874
Military academies of the United States
Universities and colleges in the Bronx
1874 establishments in New York (state)
Throggs Neck, Bronx
Public universities and colleges in New York (state)